Multiple-classification ripple-down rules (MCRDR) is an incremental knowledge acquisition technique which preserves the benefits and essential strategy of ripple-down rules (RDR) in handling the multiple classifications. MCRDR, the extension of RDR, is based on the assumption that the knowledge an expert provides is essentially a justification for a conclusion in a particular context.

Implementations
Below is a list of implementations of MCRDR
 The alpha version of RDR(MCRDR) Framework was developed by UNSW and UTAS Research Team and funded by ARC (System available at BESTRDR)
 RDR(MCRDR) document classifier was developed by Dr.Yang Sok Kim and AProf.Byeong Ho Kang (System available at BESTRDR)
 RDR(MCRDR) smart expert system was developed by UTAS Research Team and funded by Hyundai Steel.
 Pacific Knowledge Systems (PKS) uses a commercial product called RippleDown Expert that is based on Multiple Classification Ripple Down Rules
 Medscope Medication Review Mentor uses Multiple Classification Ripple Down Rules to identify adverse drug interactions with a patient's medicines regimen

BEST RDR Warehouse
BEST-RDR (Best Expert System Technique – Ripple Down Rule) website is freely accessible RDR publication and system warehouse that helps you to find programs and publications about RDR. A great amount of publications and programs based on RDR (MCRDR) are available to public.

What functions are available in the BEST RDR?
 BEST-RDR website provides detailed explanation of what the RDR and MCRDR are
 BEST-RDR provides every RDR(MCRDR) publication details from 1987 to 2013.
 BEST-RDR provides sources of various RDR(MCRDR) based system for download

See also 
 Ripple-down rules
 Case-based reasoning
 Decision trees

References

 
 
 

Knowledge management
Rules